The 2019 24H Touring Car Endurance Series powered by Hankook was the fourth season of the Touring Car Endurance Series (TCES). Creventic was the organiser and promoter of the series. The races were contested with touring cars.

Calendar

Entry List

Race results
Bold indicates overall winner.

See also
24H Series
2019 24H GT Series
2019 Dubai 24 Hour
2019 24H Middle East Series

Notes

References

2019
2019 in motorsport
2019 in 24H Series